Ousman Jallow (born 21 October 1988 in Banjul) is a Gambian footballer who plays as a striker, most recently for Cypriot club Yenicami Ağdelen. He is featured on the Gambian national team in the official 2010 FIFA World Cup video game.

Club career

Early career
Arsenal and Chelsea both chased Jallow and they almost bought him, but because of troubles with the residence/work permit, Jallow did not become an Arsenal or Chelsea player.

Brøndby IF
On 31 August 2008, the young striker signed a contract for three years with the Danish team  Brøndby IF. The transfer amount was kept secret by both Brøndby IF and his former club; Al-Ain FC.

On 5 October 2008, Jallow scored his first goal in the Brøndby-jersey, against Odense BK.

Çaykur Rizespor
His contract ended in Summer 2011. He joined on free transfer second division club Çaykur Rizespor.

HJK Helsinki
On 27 February 2015, HJK signed Jallow on a one-year contract after a short trial period.

Irtysh Pavlodar
On 27 February 2016, Jallow signed for Kazakhstan Premier League side FC Irtysh Pavlodar.

HJK Helsinki Return
On 8 August 2016, Jallow returned to HJK Helsinki, signing until the end of the 2017 season.

Yenicami
In the beginning of September 2019, Jallow joined Cypriot-Turkish club Yenicami. However, he left the club again after two weeks, having only played one game.

International career
Jallow was a member of the Youth Gambia national football team and participated in the 2007 FIFA U-20 World Cup which was won by the Youth Argentina national football team and presented his homeland on African U-20 Championship in 2007. He made his international debut on 9 September 2007 against Algeria.
Jallow was also a member of the Gambian side that won the U-17 African Nations Cup on home soil in 2005 and he scored the winning goal in the final.

Career statistics

International

Statistics accurate as of match played 29 February 2012

International goals
Scores and results list Gambia's goal tally first.

References

External links
 
 Career stats at Danmarks Radio
 Jallow signs for Çaykur Rizespor

1988 births
Living people
Gambian footballers
Gambian expatriate footballers
The Gambia international footballers
The Gambia youth international footballers
Wallidan FC players
Raja CA players
Al Ain FC players
Brøndby IF players
Çaykur Rizespor footballers
Helsingin Jalkapalloklubi players
FC Irtysh Pavlodar players
Bashundhara Kings players
Danish Superliga players
UAE Pro League players
Veikkausliiga players
TFF First League players
Kazakhstan Premier League players
Gambian expatriate sportspeople in Morocco
Gambian expatriate sportspeople in Denmark
Gambian expatriate sportspeople in Turkey
Expatriate footballers in the United Arab Emirates
Expatriate footballers in Morocco
Expatriate men's footballers in Denmark
Expatriate footballers in Turkey
Expatriate footballers in Finland
Expatriate footballers in Kazakhstan
Expatriate footballers in Bangladesh
Expatriate footballers in Cyprus
Association football forwards